Janské Lázně is a spa town in Trutnov District in the Hradec Králové Region of the Czech Republic. It has about 700 inhabitants. It lies in the Giant Mountains.

Geography

It lies in the Giant Mountains, and its northern part lies in the Krkonoše National Park. The Janský Creek springs here and flows through the municipality.

History
According to the chronicle of Simon Hüttel, a hot spring was discovered here on 6 June 1006 by John of Chockov, after whom the town was later named. The name literally means "John's Spa".

The hot water was originally used to drive the water wheel, which activated the hammer mill. The first records of using the thermal spring for bathing is from the 14th century. In 1485, an accommodation house was built next to the spring. During 1675–1680 a village was founded here by order of Johann Adolf, Prince of Schwarzenberg. In 1881, it was promoted to a market town. In 1902, the spa was bought by the municipality. In 1965, Janské Lázně became a town.

In 1928 the first funicular from Janské Lázně to the mountain Černá hora was built. In 1980 the old funicular to Černá hora was replaced by a new one with a different route.

Spa
The spa is focused mainly of treatment of musculoskeletal disorders.

Sport
Janské Lázně is known for its ski resort and have a reputation of both summer and winter sports centre. It was host of the 1925 FIS Nordic World Ski Championships and 1937 Workers' Winter Olympiad.

Sights

The Art Nouveau colonnade built in 1904 is the most popular sight in the town. There is also the Krakonoš statue from 1906.

The neo-Gothic Church of Saint John the Baptist was built in the 1880s.

To the west of the town, there is the Krkonoše Tree Top Trail, an important tourist destination.

Twin towns – sister cities

Janské Lázně is twinned with:
 Polanica-Zdrój, Poland

References

External links

Official tourist portal

Cities and towns in the Czech Republic
Populated places in Trutnov District
Spa towns in the Czech Republic
Ski areas and resorts in the Czech Republic